Edward Carrington Venable (January 31, 1853 – December 8, 1908) was a U.S. Representative from Virginia.

Biography
Born near Hampden-Sydney, in Prince Edward, Virginia, Venable attended the local school, McCabe's University High School, Petersburg, Virginia, and the University of Virginia at Charlottesville.  He taught school for three years, and then returned to Petersburg in 1876 and engaged in mercantile pursuits.

He served as delegate to the Democratic State convention in 1886, and presented credentials as a Democratic Member-elect to the Fifty-first Congress and served from March 4, 1889, to September 23, 1890, when he was succeeded by John M. Langston, who successfully contested his election.

After losing reelection, Venable resumed his former business pursuits.  He died in Baltimore, Maryland, December 8, 1908 and was interred in Blandford Cemetery, Petersburg, Virginia.

Electoral history

1888; Venable was elected to the U.S. House of Representatives with 43.08% of the vote, defeating Republicans John Mercer Langston and R. W. Arnold but the election was contested and Langston was seated.

Sources

1853 births
1908 deaths
University of Virginia alumni
Politicians from Petersburg, Virginia
Democratic Party members of the United States House of Representatives from Virginia
19th-century American politicians
Burials at Blandford Cemetery